Amar Khan (Punjabi) is a Pakistani television actress, director and writer. She has played a role of Neelofur (witch) in 2018 super natural series Belapur Ki Dayan. She further appeared in a leading roles in Ghughi, Dil-e-Bereham, Choti Choti Batain and as antagonist in Dil-e-Gumshuda. Khan made her acting debut with 2017 short film Chashm-e-Num.

Life and career 
Amar Khan was born in Lahore, Punjab. She is the daughter of actress Fareeha Jabeen. She has graduated as a filmmaker from Beaconhouse National University, Lahore. While studying, Khan ventured into making short films.

In the 2018 super-natural horror series Belapur Ki Dayan, she plays Neelofur, a witch spirit who returns from the afterlife to seek revenge on those who caused her death. The serial ran for 20 episodes and aired weekly. She worked alongside Adnan Siddiqui, Sarah Khan and Irfan Khoosat in the series.  The serial also earned her nomination for Best Emerging Talent at Lux Style Awards.

She later appeared in TV One's Ghughi in which she played a Hindu girl who falls in love with a Muslim boy played by Adnan Siddiqui. Maria Shirazi of The News International wrote, “In a short span of time, Khan has proved her versatility”. In the same year, she made episodic appearance in anthology drama Ustani Jee. She later appeared as Ayeza in Sadia Jabbar's Dil-e-Bereham opposite Wahaj Ali. Her other appearances include Zeena (women with an inferiority complex) in Angeline Malik's miniseries Choti Choti Batain and Abdullah Kadwani's Dil-e-Gumshuda as antagonist. Her performance as Alizeh is noted by the critics. Reviewer from Daily Times wrote, "Amar imbues the role of Alizey with a certain earnestness that was required to bring her to life".

As a writer, Khan wrote several critical acclaim projects including Akkad Bakkad, Dard-e-Dil, Azaad Masi, Chashm-e-Num, Black Wednesday, of which Black Wednesday earned her Best Film Award in Peace Category at 60 seconds International film Awards. Chashm-e-Num was also her acting debut in which she played a role of a blind girl and story was about a blind couple features her opposite Ahsan Khan.

She made her film debut with Mohammed Ehteshamuddin's directed feature film Dum Mastam in which she paired opposite Imran Ashraf and also wrote the project herself. The film was release in May 2022.

Filmography

As actor

As writer

Television

Telefilm

Anthology series

Music video

References

External links

Year of birth missing (living people)
Living people
Actresses from Punjab, Pakistan
Pakistani television actresses
Pakistani film actresses
Pakistani film directors
Pakistani screenwriters
Beaconhouse National University alumni
Punjabi people
21st-century Pakistani actresses